Cordova High School is a public high school (grades 9-12) located in Cordova, Tennessee, United States, within unincorporated Shelby County, to the east of the city of Memphis.

Cordova High School is a part of the Shelby County Schools district.

It is previously a Memphis City School district campus. Before the merger of MCS, Cordova High School served portions of Memphis as well as some portions of unincorporated Shelby County, which are also zoned to elementary and middle schools in the SCS district.

In 2007, Cordova High School had an expected enrollment of 2,400.

History
Cordova High School was constructed in 1996 and completed in 1997 as a joint venture between two districts known for Memphis City Schools and Shelby County Schools, as the school's operating systems. The school opened during the 1997-1998 school year to a class of freshmen as a school operated by the Shelby County Schools. The freshmen of the 1997-98 school year voted the school's colors to be green and black, and the school's mascot to be the wolf. Every following year the school added a new class until 2001, when the first graduating class left Cordova High School.

The 2003-04 school year ended with Cordova High School leaving the Shelby County Schools district and joining the Memphis City Schools district. Cordova adopted a school uniform policy in Fall 2004, since the entire Memphis City Schools district adopted a uniform policy. All schools were required to adopt one at the time. A student petition created at the end of the 2014-2015 school year caught Principal Chandler's attention, bringing an end to the uniform policy after a vote by the parents.The uniform policy was replaced by a dress code.

Courses and programs
Advanced Placement classes are available, preparing students for college. The school also offers vocational education classes, such as cosmetology, automotive, and technology based courses.

Feeder patterns
Memphis City Schools elementary and middle schools in the area that feeds students into Cordova High School are:

Cordova Elementary School
Kate Bond Elementary School
Cordova Middle School
Kate Bond Middle School

The following Shelby County elementary schools also feed into Cordova:
Chimneyrock Elementary School
Dexter Elementary School (partial)
Macon-Hall Elementary School (partial)

The following Shelby County middle schools also feed into Cordova:
Dexter Middle School (partial)
Mt. Pisgah Middle School (partial)

Athletics
Cordova athletic programs include football, soccer, cheer, wrestling, basketball, bowling, tennis and clay shooting.  They have won team championships in boys' track in 2004 and 2009.

Notable alumni
Raumesh Akbari, Tennessee State Senator, 29th District
Quinton Bohanna, NFL player 
Joy Buolamwini of the MIT Media Lab, founder of the Algorithmic Justice League
NLE Choppa, American rapper
Michael Coe, former NFL player
Phillip Merling, former NFL player
Chris Taylor, former NFL player

References

External links
 Cordova High School
 
 Cordova High school marching band
 Great Schools Rating for Cordova High School 

Public high schools in Tennessee
1997 establishments in Tennessee
Schools in Shelby County, Tennessee
Schools in Memphis, Tennessee